Holguín is one of the provinces of Cuba, the third most populous after Havana and Santiago de Cuba.  It lies in the southeast of the country. Its major cities include Holguín (the capital), Banes, Antilla, Mayarí, and Moa.

The province has a population of slightly over one million people. Its territory exceeds , 25 percent of which is covered by forest.

History

Christopher Columbus landed in what is believed to have been today's Holguín province on October 27, 1492. He declared that it was "the most beautiful land human eyes had ever seen".

The Holguín province was established in 1978, when it was split from the Oriente region.

Economy
Like much of Cuba, Holguín's economy is based around sugarcane, though other crops such as corn and coffee, as well as mining, are also large earners for the province.

A large nickel plus cobalt processing plant with shipping facilities was built in Moa, using foreign investment, much of it from Canada. Chromium, iron and steel plants dot the province as well.

Tourism has only recently begun to be developed, offering beach resorts in the outskirts of the region, with a number of hotels around the Guardalavaca area, Playa Esmeralda, Playa Yuraguanal, Playa Blanca, Playa Pesquero, and Cayo Saetia. The Cuchillas del Toa Biosphere Reserve, Sierra Cristal National Park and Alejandro de Humboldt National Park are partly located in the province. Gibara is a little visited historical port located west of the main Guardalavaca resorts. Recently a large number of tourists are reported to have visited the city and its rich culture and beauty. Direct flights to Canada and Europe from Holguin airport limit transfer time to around 1 hour to most resorts on the Costa Holguinera. Canadians and Europeans share the coral beaches with Cubans.

Municipalities
Holguín is divided into 14 municipalities:

Source: Population from 2004 and 2012 Census. Area from 1976 municipal re-distribution.

Demographics
In 2004, the province of Holguin had a population of 1,029,083.

Notable people
Fulgencio Batista, last president and military dictator of the Republican era (1902-1959)
Fidel Castro, former President of Cuba
Raúl Castro, former President of Cuba
Rolando Masferrer, politician and business man
Augusto Martinez Sánchez, revolutionary and former Minister of Labor.
Aroldis Chapman, left-handed pitcher for the New York Yankees
Frank Fernández, pianist
Calixto García, General in the three liberation wars of Cuba
Mario Kindelán two times lightweight boxing Olympic champion in 2000 and 2004
Faustino Oramas, musician
Marcos A. Rodriguez, entrepreneur and broadcaster
Manuel Galban, musician; guitar, pianist and arranger

See also

Oriente

References

External links

 Holguín.cu
 Holguin Cuba 
 Ciudad de Holguín

 
Provinces of Cuba
States and territories established in 1978
1978 establishments in Cuba